Chasing Ghosts may refer to:

 Chasing Ghosts (album), third studio album by Australian post-hardcore band, The Amity Affliction

 Chasing Ghosts, fifth studio album by industrial metal band, Stabbing Westward

 Chasing Ghosts: Beyond the Arcade, a 2007 documentary film directed by Lincoln Ruchti about the golden age of video arcade games
 Chasing Ghosts (2005 film), a mystery film starring Michael Madsen
 "Chasing Ghosts" (NCIS)
 Chasing Ghosts (The Shield)
 Chasing Ghosts, a book about the Iraq War by Lieutenant Paul Rieckhoff